KOFP may refer to:

 Hanover County Municipal Airport (ICAO code KOFP)
 KOFP-LP, a low-power radio station (103.3 FM) licensed to serve Fresno, California, United States